The following list of Alaskan companies includes notable companies that are, or once were, headquartered in Alaska.

Companies based in Alaska

A
 Ahtna, Incorporated
 Alaska Central Express
 Alaska Communications
 Alaska Power and Telephone Company
 Alaska Railroad
 Alaska USA Federal Credit Union
 Aleut Corporation
 Alyeska Pipeline Service Company
 Arctic Slope Regional Corporation
 AT&T Alascom

B
 Bering Air
 Bering Straits Native Corporation
 Bristol Bay Native Corporation

C
 Calista Corporation
 Carrs-Safeway
 Chugach Alaska Corporation
 Cook Inlet Region, Inc.
 Credit Union 1

D
 Denali Federal Credit Union
 Doyon, Limited

F
 Fairbanks Daily News-Miner
 First National Bank Alaska
 Frontier Flying Service
 FS Air Service

G
 GCI

K
 Koahnic Broadcast Corporation
 Koniag, Incorporated

L
 Lynden Air Cargo

M
 Midnight Sun Brewing Company

N
 NANA Development Corporation
 NANA Regional Corporation

O
 Ounalashka Corporation

P
 PenAir

R
 Ryan Air Services

S
 Sealaska Corporation
 Spirit of Alaska Federal Credit Union
 Santa Claus House

T
 Tanadgusix Corporation

U
 Ukpeaġvik Iñupiat Corporation

Companies formerly based in Alaska

0–9
 The 13th Regional Corporation

A
 Alaska Airlines
 Alaska Newspapers, Inc.
 Arctic Circle Air
 Ashley HomeStore

E
 Era Aviation

F
 Flight Alaska

H
 Hageland Aviation Services

L
 L.A.B. Flying Service

P
 PeaceHealth

V
 VECO Corporation

W
 Wings of Alaska

References

Companies
 
Alaska